LabWare, Inc. is an American developer of laboratory informatics software, such as laboratory information management systems, electronic laboratory notebooks and laboratory data analytics. It is a Delaware corporation, with offices in Wilmington, Delaware.

History

The company was founded in 1987 by Vance Kershner, who is president and CEO. It has offices in fifteen countries, with customers in ninety. The head office is in Wilmington, Delaware, with a training facility at Oberod Estate in Centreville. 

Pharmaceutical clients include Wyeth, Teva, AstraZeneca, Pfizer, Merck, and Bristol Myers Squibb; other users are in the food and beverage, forensics, nuclear power, environmental and water testing industries. The software is used to test for water, soil, food and air quality in the United States, Ireland, Australia, and South Africa.

In March 2022, LabWare acquired CompassRed, a data analytics company.

Awards

LabWare won the Scientific Computing and Instrumentation’s Readers’ Choice Award in the Laboratory Information Management System (LIMS) category each year between 2000 and 2008. LabWare LIMS won a Frost & Sullivan Product Quality Leadership Award in 2004, and the company won Frost and Sullivan's European Laboratory Information Management Systems (LIMS) Company of the Year Award in 2008.

References

External links
Official Site

Software companies based in Delaware
Research support companies
Companies based in Wilmington, Delaware
Software companies established in 1987
Software companies of the United States